The 1996 Delaware Fightin' Blue Hens football team represented the University of Delaware as a member of the Mid-Atlantic Division of the Yankee Conference during the 1996 NCAA Division I-AA football season. Led by 31st-year head coach Tubby Raymond, the Fightin' Blue Hens compiled an overall record of 8–4 with a mark of 6–2 in conference play, tying for second place in the Yankee Conference's Mid-Atlantic Division. Delaware advanced to the NCAA Division I-AA Football Championship playoffs, where the Fightin' Blue Hens lost to the eventual national champion, Marshall, in the first round. The team played home games at Delaware Stadium in Newark, Delaware.

Schedule

References

Delaware
Delaware Fightin' Blue Hens football seasons
Delaware Fightin' Blue Hens football